Myrciaria vismeifolia is a species of plant in the family Myrtaceae. It has been found in Bolivia, Brazil, French Guiana, Guyana, Panama, Suriname, and Venezuela. The tree grows to between 4 and 6 metres high, and produces an edible berry up to 10mm in diameter.

References

vismeifolia
Crops originating from the Americas
Tropical fruit
Flora of South America
Fruits originating in South America
Cauliflory
Fruit trees
Berries
Plants described in 1856
Taxobox binomials not recognized by IUCN